Wayne Anthony Petti is a Canadian singer-songwriter best known the vocalist for indie rock band Cuff the Duke. He has contributed to projects by Blue Rodeo, The Hylozoists and Hayden in addition to releasing material on his own and as part of his side-project Grey Lands.

Biography
Petti grew up in Oshawa, Ontario where he played with fellow Cuff the Duker Paul Lowman. After living for several years in Toronto, Petti relocated to Hamilton in 2014 where he lives with his wife and their son.

Petti released his first solo album, City Lights Align, in 2007 on Outside Music. He has also played with The Hylozoists.

Discography

 Life Stories for Minimum Wage (2002) – Cuff the Duke
 Cuff the Duke (2005) – Cuff the Duke
 La Fin Du Monde (2006) – The Hylozoists
 Sidelines of the City (2007) – Cuff the Duke
 City Lights Align (2007) – Wayne Petti
 Way Down Here (2009) – Cuff the Duke
 The Things We Left Behind (2009) – Blue Rodeo
 Morning Comes – (2011) – Cuff the Duke
 In Our Time – EP – (2011) – Cuff the Duke
 Union – 2012 – Cuff the Duke
 In Our Nature – (2013) – Blue Rodeo
 Songs by Other People (2014) – Grey Lands
 Right Arm (2015) – Grey Lands

References

External links
Cuff the Duke official website

Year of birth missing (living people)
Living people
Musicians from Oshawa
Canadian rock singers
Canadian rock guitarists
Canadian male guitarists
Canadian country singer-songwriters
Canadian male singer-songwriters
Canadian indie rock musicians
Canadian country rock musicians
Canadian alternative country singers
21st-century Canadian male singers